Tête de Valpelline is a mountain of the Pennine Alps, located on the Swiss-Italian border. It lies west of the Dent d'Hérens, between the valleys of Mattertal (Valais) and Valpelline (Aosta Valley).

References

External links
 Tête de Valpelline on Hikr

Mountains of the Alps
Alpine three-thousanders
Mountains of Switzerland
Mountains of Italy
Italy–Switzerland border
International mountains of Europe
Mountains of Valais